The Diving competition in the 1999 Summer Universiade were held in Palma de Mallorca, Spain.

Medal overview

Medal table

References
 

1999 Summer Universiade
1999
1999 in diving